Larry Richard Drake (February 21, 1949 – March 17, 2016) was an American actor and comedian. He was best known as Benny Stulwicz in L.A. Law, for which he won two Primetime Emmy Awards.  He also appeared as Robert G. Durant in both Darkman and Darkman II: The Return of Durant, a homicidal mental patient who escapes an insane asylum in the slasher black comedy Dr. Giggles, and was the voice of Pops in Johnny Bravo.

Early life
Larry Richard Drake was born in Tulsa, Oklahoma, on February 21, 1950, the son of Raymond John Drake, a drafting engineer for an oil company, and Lorraine Ruth (née Burns), a homemaker. He graduated from Tulsa Edison High School and the University of Oklahoma.

Career
Drake is mostly remembered for his portrayal of developmentally disabled Benny Stulwicz in L.A. Law, from 1987 until the show's end in 1994, for which he twice won the Primetime Emmy Award for Outstanding Supporting Actor in a Drama Series. in 1988 and 1989. He returned to the role of Benny in L.A. Law: The Movie, a "reunion movie" that aired on NBC in 2002.

He appeared in numerous film and television roles, including Time Quest, Dark Asylum, Paranoid, Bean, Overnight Delivery, The Beast, The Journey of August King, Murder in New Hampshire, Dr. Giggles, Darkman, Darkman II: The Return of Durant, The Taming of the Shrew, American Pie 2, and Dark Night of the Scarecrow. He was a regular on Prey. Drake provided the voice of Pops in Johnny Bravo. In 2007, he co-starred in Gryphon, a Sci-Fi Pictures original film.

Personal life
Drake was married from 1989 to 1991 to Ruth de Sosa, an actress and producer known for her roles in The Young Indiana Jones Chronicles and Planes, Trains and Automobiles.

Death
On March 17, 2016, Drake was found dead in his Los Angeles home at the age of 66. Drake's manager, Steven Siebert, reported that the actor had some health problems in the months before his death. It was later reported that Drake suffered from a rare form of blood cancer that caused his blood to thicken.

Filmography

Film

Television

Video games

References

External links

1950 births
2016 deaths
American male comedians
American male film actors
American male television actors
American male voice actors
Burials at Hollywood Forever Cemetery
Deaths from blood cancer
Deaths from cancer in California
Outstanding Performance by a Supporting Actor in a Drama Series Primetime Emmy Award winners
Male actors from Tulsa, Oklahoma
University of Oklahoma alumni
20th-century American comedians
21st-century American comedians
20th-century American male actors
21st-century American male actors